M.E.S. Ponnani College is an art, science and commerce college run by the MES, accredited with A+ grade of the National Assessment and Accreditation Council, situated at Ponnani, in the Malappuram district of Kerala, India.  It is located on the coastal belt of Malappuram District between Tirur and Guruvayoor. It is affiliated to the Calicut University.

History
The college was established on 3 March 1968.  M.E.S founder Dr. P. K. Abdul Gafoor, former Kerala ministers E. K. Imbichi Bava and C.H. Mohammed Koya had a major role in the establishment of the college.

Notable alumni
 Padma Shri Thalappil Pradeep, Scientist
 Salam Bappu, film director
 Iqbal Kuttippuram, script writer

See also

References

External links

Official website
University of Calicut
University Grants Commission
National Assessment and Accreditation Council

Arts and Science colleges in Kerala
Colleges affiliated with the University of Calicut
Universities and colleges in Malappuram district
Educational institutions established in 1968
1968 establishments in Kerala